Iceland's first ambassador to Belgium was Pétur Benediktsson in 1946. Iceland's current ambassador to Belgium is Þórir Ibsen.

List of ambassadors

See also
Foreign relations of Iceland
Ambassadors of Iceland

References
List of Icelandic representatives (Icelandic Foreign Ministry website) 

1946 establishments
Main
Belgium
Iceland